The 2013 PartyPoker.net Mosconi Cup, the 20th edition of the annual nine-ball pool competition between teams representing Europe and the United States, took place 2–4 December 2013 at the Mirage in Las Vegas, Nevada.

Team Europe won the Mosconi Cup by defeating Team USA 11–2.


Teams

Results

Monday, 2 December

Tuesday, 3 December

Wednesday, 4 December

References

External links
 Official homepage

2013
2013 in cue sports
2013 in sports in Nevada
Sports competitions in Las Vegas
December 2013 sports events in the United States